David O'Connell may refer to:
Dáithí Ó Conaill (1938–1991), Irish republican
David O'Connell (politician) (born 1940), American politician
David G. O'Connell (1953–2023), Irish-born American auxiliary bishop Roman Catholic Archdiocese of Los Angeles, 2015–2023
David J. O'Connell (politician) (1868–1930), U.S. Representative from New York
David J. O'Connell (producer), American editor, producer and production manager
David M. O'Connell (born 1955), American bishop of the Roman Catholic Diocese of Trenton
David O'Connell (footballer) (born 1963), Australian rules footballer

See also 
David Connell (disambiguation)